Roland Gunnesch (sometimes spelled Gunesch or Guneș; born 25 March 1944) is a retired Romanian handball player of German ethnicity. During his career he earned 170 caps with the national team and scored 252 goals, winning the world title in 1970 and 1974 and Olympic medals in 1972 and 1976.

He was discovered as a handball talent by Hans Zultner, his physical education teacher at high school in Sighișoara, and after graduating went to play for Politehnica Timişoara. After retiring from competitions he became a handball coach and manager. He was assistant coach for Politehnica Timişoara in 1983–1991 and managed the Romanian University national team that won the World University Games in 1987. After that he immigrated to Germany.

Gunnesch is married and has a daughter.

References

1944 births
Living people
CSA Steaua București (handball) players 
Romanian handball coaches
Handball players at the 1972 Summer Olympics
Handball players at the 1976 Summer Olympics
Olympic handball players of Romania
Romanian male handball players
Olympic silver medalists for Romania
Olympic bronze medalists for Romania
Transylvanian Saxon people
People from Mureș County
Olympic medalists in handball
Medalists at the 1976 Summer Olympics
Medalists at the 1972 Summer Olympics